ToyLikeMe is a UK-based arts and play not-for-profit organisation which campaigns for better disability representation in the toy industry.

History
ToyLikeMe was established in April 2015 by Rebecca Atkinson.. Atkinson and cofounder Karen Newell began making over toys such as fairies with guide dogs and a Tinkerbell doll with a hot pink cochlear implant.

Influence within the global toy industry
Since the #ToyLikeMe campaign of 2015 many toy brands have produced toys which represent disability. Lottie dolls have issued dolls with cochlear implants, autism and achondroplasia, whilst Barbie have extended their line to include wheelchairs, prosthetic limps, vitiligo and albinism.

Teaching resources
ToyLikeMe has developed three downloadable resources on TES.com for teachers of KS1 and KS2 about disability, identity, play and representation.

Pre-school animation series
In May 2019 ToyLikeMe co-founder Rebecca Atkinson announced that she's creating a pre-school animation series called Mixmups along with Mackinnon & Saunders and Raydar Media.

The Mixmups show centres around three little friends with a light-up wooden spoon and a magical mixing box combining play and imagination to mix up adventures. The show features lead characters with a wheelchair and another with a guide dog.

References 

2015 establishments in England